El Tiempo is a nationally distributed broadsheet daily newspaper in Colombia launched on January 30, 1911. , El Tiempo had the highest circulation in Colombia with an average daily weekday of 1,137,483 readers, rising to 1,921,571 readers for the Sunday edition. 

From 1913 to 2007, El Tiempo'''s main shareholders were members of the Santos family. Several also participated in Colombian politics: Eduardo Santos Montejo was President of Colombia from 1938 to 1942. Francisco Santos Calderón served as Vice-President (2002–2010). And Juan Manuel Santos as Defense Minister (2006–2009) during Álvaro Uribe's administration; Juan Manuel was elected president of Colombia in 2010 and served in that position until 2018.

In 2007, Spanish Grupo Planeta acquired 55% of the Casa Editorial El Tiempo media group, including the newspaper and its associated TV channel Citytv Bogotá. In 2012, businessman Luis Carlos Sarmiento Angulo bought the shares of Planeta, the Santos family and other small shareholders, becoming the only owner of the newspaper. El Tiempo is considered a newspaper of record for Colombia.

History
The newspaper was founded in 1911 by Alfonso Villegas Restrepo. In 1913 it was purchased by his brother-in-law, Eduardo Santos Montejo. From then until 2007, El Tiempo's main shareholders were members of the Santos family, as part of the media conglomerate Casa Editorial El Tiempo. In 2007, the Spanish Grupo Planeta obtained majority ownership of the daily, but in 2012 sold majority ownership to Luis Carlos Sarmiento Angulo who now owns 86% of El Tiempo.

Between 2001 and 2008, when El Espectador was published as a weekly newspaper, El Tiempo was Colombia's only national daily newspaper.El Tiempo is considered a newspaper of record for Colombia.

DistributionEl Tiempo is published in six regional editions:
 Bogotá
 Caribe (Barranquilla, Cartagena, Santa Marta, Sincelejo, Riohacha and Valledupar)
 Medellín
 Café (Pereira, Manizales, Armenia)
 Cali (Cali, Popayán, Pasto)
 Region, for the remainder of the country.

On Sundays there are special sections. For about 3 years it published every Sunday a special section with a weekly selection of articles from The New York Times, translated into Spanish and using the same pictures. This section was dropped in January 2008 and since August 2008 it has been published by rival newspaper El Espectador.El Tiempo'' is part of Grupo de Diarios América (America Newspaper Group), an organization of eleven leading newspapers from eleven Latin American countries.

References

External links

 El Tiempo

Newspapers established in 1911
Newspapers published in Colombia
Spanish-language newspapers
Spanish-language websites